Fritz Schlieper (4 August 1892 – 4 June 1977) was a German military officer who served during World War I and World War II, eventually gaining the rank of Generalleutnant.

Biography
Fritz Schlieper was born 4 August 1892 in Koldromb, Posen. In 1911, he joined the German Army. After the First World War, Schlieper continued to serve in the Weimar Republic's Reichswehr and when the Weimar Republic was replaced by Nazi Germany, he remained in the Heer component of the Wehrmacht and from 1935 to 1939 commanded the 17th Artillery Regiment. In 1939, he was promoted to Generalmajor and served as Chief of Staff for Military District XIII and during the Invasion of Poland, served as the Chief of Staff for Frontier Sector Center. From 1939 to 1940, he was also the Quartermaster for the 18th Army.

During Operation Barbarossa, he commanded the 45th Infantry Division in one of the initial battles, the Defense of Brest Fortress. For his part in these battles, he would be awarded the Knight's Cross of the Iron Cross. In 1942, he was transferred to Slovakia to lead German military mission at Slovakian Ministry of Defence.  He was released from his position after conflict with Minister General Ferdinand Čatloš. From 1944 until the war's end, he was the Chief of Special Staff II. After the war, Schlieper lived in Nürnberg until his death on 4 June 1977.

Awards
 Iron Cross (1914)
 2nd class
 1st Class
 Honour Cross of the World War 1914/1918
 Clasp to the Iron Cross (1939)
 2nd Class 
 1st Class 
Knight's Cross of the Iron Cross on 27 December 1941 as Generalmajor and commander of the 45. Infanterie-Division
The Eastern Front Medal (1942)

References

Citations

Bibliography

 
 

1892 births
1977 deaths
People from the Province of Posen
German Army personnel of World War I
Prussian Army personnel
Lieutenant generals of the German Army (Wehrmacht)
Recipients of the Knight's Cross of the Iron Cross
People from Żnin County